Herbert Seymour Saffir (29 March 1917 – 21 November 2007) was an American civil engineer who co-developed (with meteorologist Robert Simpson) the Saffir–Simpson Hurricane Scale for measuring the intensity of hurricanes. As recently as 2005 Saffir was the principal of Saffir Engineering in Coral Gables, Florida. He also published articles on designing buildings for high wind resistance.

Education and early career
Originally from Brooklyn, Saffir graduated from the Georgia Institute of Technology in 1940 with a B.S. in civil engineering. Saffir worked for Dade County, Florida beginning in 1947 as an assistant county engineer, and worked on updating the county building code. Since that time, he had traveled extensively to study windstorm damage for clues to improvements and has been a tireless advocate for stricter codes in hurricane-prone areas.

Later career 
In 1975 Saffir was working on a study of windstorm damage on low-cost housing commissioned by the United Nations (UN), Saffir developed a scale to categorize the intensity of hurricanes by their maximum wind speed. In 1969, his friend Bob Simpson, then-director of the National Hurricane Center (NHC), added information on the potential storm surge and range of central pressures for each category, resulting in what later became known as the Saffir–Simpson Hurricane Scale.

Saffir survived the burning of the cruise ship  on 8 September 1934. The ship was en route from Havana to New York when it caught fire and burned, killing a total of 137 passengers and crew members.

On 21 November 2007 Herbert Saffir died of a heart attack at South Miami Hospital in Miami according to his son, Richard Saffir. He was 90 years old.

See also
 Hurricane engineering
 Structural engineering
 Wind engineering

References

External links
 Obituary in The Times, 29 November 2007

1917 births
2007 deaths
Georgia Tech alumni
People from Brooklyn
American civil engineers
Engineers from New York City
20th-century American engineers